Cornu is a genus of land snails in the family Helicidae.

References

Helicidae
Taxa described in 1778